Mount Karisimbi is an active stratovolcano in the Virunga Mountains on the border between Rwanda and the Democratic Republic of Congo. At , Karisimbi is the highest of the eight major mountains of the mountain range, which is a part of Albertine Rift, the western branch of the East African Rift. Karisimbi is flanked by Mikeno to the north, Bisoke to the east and Nyiragongo to the west, on the other side of the Rift Valley. Karisimbi is the 11th highest mountain of Africa.

The name Karisimbi comes from the word 'amasimbi' in the local language, Kinyarwanda, which means snow. Snow can mostly be found during the dry season in June, July and August on the top of the volcano.

Between Karisimbi and Bisoke is the Karisoke Research Center, which was founded by Dian Fossey in order to observe the mountain gorillas living in this area.

1908 expedition
On February 27, 1908, an expedition led by Egon Von Kirschstein was coming down the Branca Crater when a hailstorm and snowstorm caused twenty of the expedition's porters to perish.

See also
 List of volcanoes in Rwanda
 List of Ultras of Africa

Notes

References
 
 

Stratovolcanoes of the Democratic Republic of the Congo
Virunga Mountains
Stratovolcanoes of Rwanda
Mountains of Rwanda
Mountains of the Democratic Republic of the Congo
Inactive volcanoes
Democratic Republic of the Congo–Rwanda border
International mountains of Africa
Highest points of countries
Four-thousanders of Africa